Ochyrotica mexicana is a moth of the family Pterophoridae. It is known from Guatemala, Mexico and Venezuela.

The wingspan is 15–16 mm. Adults are on wing in July, August and November.

External links

Ochyroticinae
Moths described in 1990